The 2018–19 season was Frosinone Calcio's second-ever season in Serie A. The club were promoted as champions of Serie B at the end of the 2017–18 season, after spending two seasons in the second division following their maiden Serie A campaign in 2015–16. Frosinone competed in Serie A and the Coppa Italia.

Players

Squad information

Appearances include league matches only

Transfers

In

Loans in

Out

Loans out

Competitions

Serie A

League table

Results summary

Results by round

Matches

Coppa Italia

Statistics

Appearances and goals

|-
! colspan=14 style=background:#DCDCDC; text-align:center"| Goalkeepers

|-
! colspan=14 style=background:#DCDCDC; text-align:center"| Defenders

|-
! colspan=14 style=background:#DCDCDC; text-align:center"| Midfielders

|-
! colspan=14 style=background:#DCDCDC; text-align:center"| Forwards

|-
! colspan=14 style=background:#DCDCDC; text-align:center"| Players transferred out during the season

Goalscorers

Last updated: 20 January 2019

Clean sheets

Last updated: 20 January 2019

Disciplinary record

Last updated: 20 January 2019

References

Frosinone Calcio seasons
Frosinone